Shenton railway station is located about 0.5 miles from the village of Shenton, Leicestershire, England.

It is the current southern terminus of the Battlefield Line Railway, which runs to here from Shackerstone. The station is located at the foot of Ambion Hill and is actually the reconstructed Humberstone Road Station from Leicester. The original station closed in 1965 and was dismantled and relocated (except for a small lamp room that now serves as the Station Pottery).

The station is a former stop on the London and North Western Railway and the Midland Railway, who jointly operated the line between Moira West Junction and Nuneaton. The station was designed by the Midland Railway company architect John Holloway Sanders.

References

Heritage railway stations in Leicestershire
Railway stations in Great Britain opened in 1873
Railway stations in Great Britain closed in 1931
Former London and North Western Railway stations
Former Midland Railway stations
John Holloway Sanders railway stations